Destination Truth is an American paranormal reality television series that premiered on June 6, 2007, on Syfy. Produced by Mandt Bros. Productions and Ping Pong Productions, the program follows paranormal researcher Josh Gates around the world to investigate claims of the supernatural, mainly in the field of cryptozoology. The third season concluded on April 21, 2010, and holds the highest ratings ever for the series, which continued with a fourth season, beginning on Thursday, September 9, 2010, at 9:00 p.m. ET/PT. The fifth season began July 10, 2012. On March 27, 2014, Gates confirmed via his Facebook account that Destination Truth had ended its run and would not be returning for a sixth season.

Format
Each episode runs for about 45 minutes and typically features two investigations of paranormal activity, usually involving the search for cryptozoological creatures. Gates and his team venture out to various locations around the world where Gates interviews witnesses, reviews any physical evidence they might have, and researches the local history. Later, Gates and his team go into the field, often after nightfall, in an attempt to capture firsthand evidence of the existence of these legendary creatures. Any evidence gathered is then sent to independent experts, generally laboratories or academics in the United States, for further analysis.

The cases rely heavily on field investigation. Typically, Gates' team members split up into two or more groups to survey an area using night vision and thermal imaging cameras. They also commonly use electromagnetic field monitoring and detection equipment when cases contain claims of the supernatural. The team use walkie-talkies to relay findings to a base camp, but also carry backpack mounted cameras, microphone rigs, and hand held night vision systems to gather evidence, and to replace a traditional camera and sound crew.

Footage from the show is usually edited from an entertainment perspective that relies on "suspense building mechanisms" such as brief segments involving team members becoming agitated or startled, asserting they have seen or heard something of interest and then followed by a sudden cut to a commercial break. Conclusion of what happened is then revealed after the break.

At the end of each segment the show details the teams findings with a brief dialog in which Gates typically either states that the accounts on which the case was based are largely myth, or that they are supported by the team's findings.

Ratings
The season three premiere of Destination Truth hit a series high with 2.1 million viewers, the largest number of viewers ever for an episode of the series and the first episode to be watched by over two million viewers. The second episode of the season broke more ratings records, despite formidable competition, and achieved 2.021 million viewers, the second episode of the series to have more than 2 million viewers, and the second episode in a row to do so. The fourth episode broke the record set by the season premiere, with 2.3 million viewers. When season 3 continued on March 17, 2010, the show received its best premiere rating, with 2.2 million viewers.

Episodes

Cast and crew

A feature of Destination Truth is that along with Josh Gates, who heads up the investigations, members of his production crew also directly participate in the cases and double as his research team rather than remaining behind the scenes and off camera.

Guest appearances
Over the seasons, Gates has built a relationship with the TAPS team from SyFy's paranormal show, Ghost Hunters and frequently brings his own ghost hunting evidence to them for review and comment. Likewise, Gates has been on their programs, frequently hosting their Halloween specials and other live events.

References

External links
  by Syfy
  by Mandt Bros. Productions
  by Ping Pong Productions
 

Syfy original programming
Cryptozoological television series
Paranormal reality television series
2000s American reality television series
2010s American reality television series
2007 American television series debuts
2012 American television series endings